Cervon is a commune in the Nièvre department in central France.

Demographics
On 1 January 2019, the estimated population was 661.

See also
Communes of the Nièvre department
Morvan Regional Natural Park

References

Communes of Nièvre